Navigation Road is a station that serves both Northern Trains and Manchester Metrolink located in the east of Altrincham, in Greater Manchester, England. It consists of a Northern-operated heavy rail station on the Mid-Cheshire Line, and an adjoining light rail stop on the Altrincham Line of Greater Manchester's Metrolink network. The original heavy rail element of the station was opened by the Manchester, South Junction and Altrincham Railway in 1931, and the Metrolink element opened in 1992. A level crossing operates at the southern end of the station.

History

The station originally opened on 20 July 1931 on  the Manchester, South Junction and Altrincham Railway (MSJAR) following the electrification of that line, and was referred to as Navigation Road (Altrincham) on early tickets, timetables, etc. British Rail electric trains between Manchester and Altrincham ceased serving the station on 24 December 1991. The former Altrincham-bound (down) platform has since  been used for Mid-Cheshire Line trains and  the former Manchester-bound (up) platform reopened as a Metrolink stop on 15 June 1992.
Freight trains also operate through Navigation Road, including heavy block trains carrying limestone from quarries at Tunstead (near Buxton) to alkali works at Northwich.

Facilities
There is a car park on the Metrolink side of the station with 65 spaces plus 5 disabled spaces.

In January 2018 a ticket machine was installed within the shelter on the heavy rail side of the station. Pre-ordered tickets can be collected here as well as buying tickets for journeys from this station.

The nearest hospitality venues to the Navigation Road stop are The Waiting Room Cafe at A4 studios and The Hive by VH Interiors a General Store & Beverage Bar, both located on Grosvenor Road on the way into Altrincham.

Services

Rail
Navigation Road is served by an hourly train service between Manchester Piccadilly and Chester via Stockport and Northwich, which is run by Northern Trains, with additional trains at peak times. The Sunday service originally ran only between Chester and Altrincham thus not serving Navigation Road, with passengers connecting onto the Metrolink at Altrincham for stations to Manchester, however a 2-hourly Sunday service to Manchester and beyond is now in place.

Metrolink

Navigation Road is located on the Altrincham Line with trams towards Altrincham stopping every 6 minutes during the day Monday to Saturday and every 12 minutes Monday to Saturday evenings and on Sundays. In the opposite direction, trams head towards Piccadilly and Bury, with the Monday to Saturday daytime service running every 12 minutes to both Piccadilly and Bury. Evening and Sunday journeys run to Piccadilly only.

As of January 2019, Navigation Road is located in Metrolink fare zone 4.

Service pattern 
10 trams per hour to Altrincham (5 off-peak)
5 trams per hour to Bury (peak only)
5 trams per hour to Piccadilly.

Bus
Navigation Road station is served by Diamond Bus routes 285, which runs anti-clockwise, and 286, which runs clockwise, both running every hour. These routes run between Altrincham Interchange and Timperley, as a circular service.

References

Further reading

External links

National Rail Enquiries - Station Facilities for Navigation Road
Metrolink Times Information and Stop Information
Navigation Road Metrolink area map
 Picture of Navigation Road station The Trams.co.uk
  Mid-Cheshire Community Rail Partnership

Railway stations in Trafford
DfT Category F2 stations
Tram stops in Trafford
Former Manchester, South Junction and Altrincham Railway stations
Railway stations in Great Britain opened in 1931
Railway stations in Great Britain closed in 1991
Railway stations in Great Britain opened in 1992
Northern franchise railway stations
Tram stops on the Altrincham to Bury line
Tram stops on the Altrincham to Piccadilly line